The following outline is provided as an overview of and topical guide to New Zealand:

New Zealand is an island nation located in the western South Pacific Ocean comprising two large islands, the North Island and the South Island, and numerous smaller islands, most notably Stewart Island / Rakiura and the Chatham Islands.  The indigenous Māori  originally called the North Island Aotearoa, commonly translated into English as "The Land of the Long White Cloud"; "Aotearoa" is now used as the Māori language name for the entire country.

Because of its remoteness, it was one of the last lands to be settled by humans. During its long period of isolation, New Zealand developed a distinct biodiversity of animal, fungal and plant life. The country's varied topography and its sharp mountain peaks, such as the Southern Alps, owe much to the tectonic uplift of land and volcanic eruptions. New Zealand's capital city is Wellington, while its most populous city is Auckland.

The population is mostly of European descent, with the indigenous Māori being the largest minority. Asians and non-Māori Pacific Islanders are also significant minorities, especially in the cities. Charles III, as the King of New Zealand, is the head of state and, in his absence, is represented by a non-partisan governor-general. Political power is held by the democratically elected New Zealand Parliament under the leadership of the Prime Minister, who is the head of government. The Realm of New Zealand also includes the Cook Islands and Niue, which are self-governing but in free association; Tokelau; and the Ross Dependency (New Zealand's territorial claim in Antarctica).

General reference 
 Pronunciation: 
 Official English country name:  New Zealand
 Official Māori country name: Aotearoa 
 Endonym: New Zealand
 Adjectival:  New Zealand
 Demonym:  New Zealander, "Kiwi"
 Etymology: Name of New Zealand
 International rankings of New Zealand
 ISO country codes:  NZ, NZL, 554
 ISO region codes:  See ISO 3166-2:NZ
 Internet country code top-level domain:  .nz

Geography of New Zealand 

Geography of New Zealand
 New Zealand is...
 a group of islands
 a country
 an island country
 a Commonwealth realm
 Location:
 Southern Hemisphere and Eastern Hemisphere
 Pacific Ocean
 South Pacific Ocean
 Oceania
 Polynesia
 Australasia
 Time in New Zealand:
 Chatham Islands – Chatham Standard Time (UTC+12:45), Chatham Daylight Time (UTC+13:45)
 Rest of New Zealand – New Zealand Standard Time (UTC+12), New Zealand Daylight Time (UTC+13) September–April
 Extreme points of New Zealand
 North: Nugent Island, Kermadec Islands
 South: Jacquemart Island, Campbell Islands
 East: Kahuitara Point, Pitt Island, Chatham Islands
 West: Cape Lovitt, Auckland Island
 High: Aoraki / Mount Cook 
 Low: 45°55'02"S 170°10'58"E; near Momona, Taieri Plain, Otago -2 m
 Land boundaries:  none
 Coastline:  South Pacific Ocean 15,134 km (10th)
 Population of New Zealand: 4,982,068 (30 April 2020)  – 120th most populous country
 Area of New Zealand: 268,680 km2
 Atlas of New Zealand
 Surveying in New Zealand

Environment of New Zealand 

Environment of New Zealand
 Biodiversity of New Zealand
 Flora of New Zealand
 Fauna of New Zealand
 Birds of New Zealand
 Mammals of New Zealand
 Climate of New Zealand
 Climate change in New Zealand
 Ecoregions in New Zealand
 Environmental issues in New Zealand
 Geology of New Zealand
 List of earthquakes in New Zealand
 Natural history of New Zealand
 Stratigraphy of New Zealand
 Volcanism of New Zealand
 Pollution in New Zealand
 Protected areas of New Zealand
 Marine reserves of New Zealand
 National parks of New Zealand
 Renewable energy in New Zealand

Natural geographic features of New Zealand 

 Caves of New Zealand
 Fjords of New Zealand
 Glaciers of New Zealand
 Islands of New Zealand
 Lakes of New Zealand
 Mountains of New Zealand
 Volcanoes in New Zealand
 Rivers of New Zealand
 Waterfalls of New Zealand
 List of rock formations of New Zealand 
 World Heritage Sites in New Zealand

Political geography of New Zealand

Administrative divisions of New Zealand 

Administrative divisions of New Zealand
 Regions of New Zealand
 Territorial authorities of New Zealand
 Districts of New Zealand
 Cities of New Zealand

Demography of New Zealand 

Demographics of New Zealand

Government and politics of New Zealand 

Politics of New Zealand
 Capital of New Zealand: Wellington
 Form of government:
 Liberal democracy
 Parliamentary system
 Elections in New Zealand
 Electoral system of New Zealand
 Voting in New Zealand
 Political parties in New Zealand
 Taxation in New Zealand
 Types
 Anarchism
 Christian
 Conservatism
 Fascism
 Feminism in New Zealand
 Māori
 Liberalism
 Populism
 Republicanism
 Socialism
 Issues
 Abortion
 Capital punishment
 Electoral reform
 Flag debate
 Gun law
 Nuclear-free zone
 Prostitution
 Same-sex marriage
Treaty of Waitangi claims and settlements
 Policies
 Think Big
 Rogernomics
 Ruthanasia
 Working for Families
Principles of the Treaty of Waitangi

Branches of the government of New Zealand

Executive branch of the government of New Zealand 
 New Zealand Government 
 Head of state: King of New Zealand, Charles III
 Governor-General of New Zealand, Dame Cindy Kiro
 Head of government: Prime Minister of New Zealand, Chris Hipkins
 Ministers in the New Zealand Government
 Cabinet of New Zealand

Legislative branch of the government of New Zealand 

 New Zealand Parliament (unicameral)
 New Zealand House of Representatives

Judicial branch of the government of New Zealand 

 Judiciary of New Zealand
 Supreme Court of New Zealand
 Judicial review in New Zealand

Foreign relations of New Zealand 

Foreign relations of New Zealand
 Diplomatic missions in New Zealand
 Diplomatic missions of New Zealand
 Australia–New Zealand relations
 New Zealand–United Kingdom relations

International organisation membership 
New Zealand is a member of:

Asian Development Bank (ADB)
Asia-Pacific Economic Cooperation (APEC)
Association of Southeast Asian Nations (ASEAN) (dialogue partner)
Association of Southeast Asian Nations Regional Forum (ARF)
Australia Group
Australia-New Zealand-United States Security Treaty (ANZUS)
Bank for International Settlements (BIS)
Colombo Plan (CP)
Commonwealth of Nations
East Asia Summit (EAS)
European Bank for Reconstruction and Development (EBRD)
Food and Agriculture Organization (FAO)
International Atomic Energy Agency (IAEA)
International Bank for Reconstruction and Development (IBRD)
International Chamber of Commerce (ICC)
International Civil Aviation Organization (ICAO)
International Criminal Court (ICCt)
International Criminal Police Organization (Interpol)
International Development Association (IDA)
International Energy Agency (IEA)
International Federation of Red Cross and Red Crescent Societies (IFRCS)
International Finance Corporation (IFC)
International Fund for Agricultural Development (IFAD)
International Hydrographic Organization (IHO)
International Labour Organization (ILO)
International Maritime Organization (IMO)
International Mobile Satellite Organization (IMSO)
International Monetary Fund (IMF)
International Olympic Committee (IOC)
International Organization for Migration (IOM)

International Organization for Standardization (ISO)
International Red Cross and Red Crescent Movement (ICRM)
International Telecommunication Union (ITU)
International Telecommunications Satellite Organization (ITSO)
International Trade Union Confederation (ITUC)
Inter-Parliamentary Union (IPU)
Nonaligned Movement (NAM) (guest)
Nuclear Suppliers Group (NSG)
Organisation for Economic Co-operation and Development (OECD)
Organisation for the Prohibition of Chemical Weapons (OPCW)
Pacific Islands Forum (PIF)
 The Pacific Community (SPC)
Permanent Court of Arbitration (PCA)
South Pacific Regional Trade and Economic Cooperation Agreement (Sparteca)
United Nations (UN)
United Nations Conference on Trade and Development (UNCTAD)
United Nations Educational, Scientific, and Cultural Organization (UNESCO)
United Nations High Commissioner for Refugees (UNHCR)
United Nations Industrial Development Organization (UNIDO)
United Nations Integrated Mission in Timor-Leste (UNMIT)
United Nations Mission in the Sudan (UNMIS)
United Nations Truce Supervision Organization (UNTSO)
Universal Postal Union (UPU)
World Customs Organization (WCO)
World Federation of Trade Unions (WFTU)
World Health Organization (WHO)
World Intellectual Property Organization (WIPO)
World Meteorological Organization (WMO)
World Trade Organization (WTO)

Law and order in New Zealand 

Law of New Zealand
 Cannabis in New Zealand
 Capital punishment in New Zealand
 Constitution of New Zealand
 Crime in New Zealand
 Human rights in New Zealand
 Disability rights in New Zealand
 LGBT rights in New Zealand
 Law enforcement in New Zealand
 Terrorism in New Zealand

Military of New Zealand 

New Zealand Defence Force
 Ministry of Defence of New Zealand
 Forces
 Army of New Zealand
 Navy of New Zealand
 Air Force of New Zealand
 Special Forces of New Zealand
 Military history of New Zealand
 Military ranks of New Zealand

Local government in New Zealand 

Local government in New Zealand

History of New Zealand 

History of New Zealand
 Archaeology of New Zealand
 Independence of New Zealand
 Military history of New Zealand
 Political history of New Zealand
 Treaty of Waitangi
 Waihi miners' strike
 1951 waterfront dispute
 1981 Springbok Tour
 Rogernomics
 Ruthanasia
 1993 electoral referendum
 Political scandals in New Zealand
 Corngate
 Foreshore and seabed controversy
 Orewa speech
 Tea tape scandal
 Timeline of New Zealand history

Culture of New Zealand 

Culture of New Zealand
 Architecture of New Zealand
 Cuisine of New Zealand
 Festivals in New Zealand
 Housing in New Zealand
 Languages of New Zealand
 New Zealand English
 Māori language
 New Zealand Sign Language
 Māori culture
 Media in New Zealand
 Museums in New Zealand
 National symbols of New Zealand
 Coat of arms of New Zealand
 Flag of New Zealand
 National anthems of New Zealand
 Public holidays in New Zealand
 Religion in New Zealand
 Christianity in New Zealand
 Hinduism in New Zealand
 Islam in New Zealand
 Judaism in New Zealand
 Sikhism in New Zealand
 World Heritage Sites in New Zealand

Art in New Zealand 
 Art of New Zealand
 Cinema of New Zealand
 Literature of New Zealand
 Music of New Zealand
 Television in New Zealand
 Theatre in New Zealand
 Kapa haka

Sports in New Zealand 

Sports in New Zealand
 Rugby union in New Zealand (national sport)
 Rugby league in New Zealand
 Football in New Zealand
 Horse racing in New Zealand
 New Zealand at the Olympics
 Stadiums in New Zealand
 Horse tracks in New Zealand

Economy and infrastructure of New Zealand 

Economy of New Zealand
 Agriculture in New Zealand
 Banks in New Zealand
 Reserve Bank of New Zealand
 Communications in New Zealand
 Internet in New Zealand
 Telecommunications in New Zealand
 Companies of New Zealand
Currency of New Zealand: Dollar
ISO 4217: NZD
 Energy in New Zealand
 New Zealand Emissions Trading Scheme
 Oil and gas industry in New Zealand
 Health care in New Zealand
 Hospitals in New Zealand
 Mental health in New Zealand
 Mining in New Zealand
 New Zealand Stock Exchange
 Tourism in New Zealand
 Transport in New Zealand
 Airports in New Zealand
 Rail transport in New Zealand
 Roads in New Zealand
 Water supply and sanitation in New Zealand

Education in New Zealand 

 Education in New Zealand
 Secondary education in New Zealand
 Tertiary education in New Zealand

See also 

List of articles about Australia and New Zealand jointly
List of international rankings
List of New Zealand-related topics
Member state of the Commonwealth of Nations
Member state of the United Nations
Monarchy of New Zealand
Outline of geography
Outline of Oceania

References

External links 

Te Ara, The Encyclopedia of New Zealand
New Zealand Plant Conservation Network website for information about the indigenous flora and species of introduced weed and animal pest
Ministry for Culture and Heritage – includes information on flag, anthems and coat of arms
New Zealand Government portal
Congressional Research Service (CRS) Reports regarding New Zealand
New Zealand weather
NZHistory.net.nz New Zealand history website
New Zealand in Profile 2007, by Statistics New Zealand
Tourism New Zealand

New Zealand
 
New Zealand